The 2018 BetVictor Northern Ireland Open was a professional ranking snooker tournament that took place between 12 and 18 November 2018 in the Waterfront Hall in Belfast, Northern Ireland. It was the eighth ranking event of the 2018/2019 season and a part of the Home Nations Series.

Mark Williams was the defending champion, but he was beaten 3–4 by Ali Carter in the second round.

Judd Trump won his ninth professional ranking title with a 9–7 final victory against Ronnie O'Sullivan.

Prize fund
The breakdown of prize money for this year is shown below:

 Winner: £70,000
 Runner-up: £30,000
 Semi-final: £20,000
 Quarter-final: £10,000
 Last 16: £6,000
 Last 32: £3,500
 Last 64: £2,500

 Highest break: £2,000
 Total: £366,000

The "rolling 147 prize" for a maximum break: £10,000

Main draw

Top half

Section 1

Section 2

Section 3

Section 4

Bottom half

Section 5

Section 6

Section 7

Section 8

Finals

Final

Century breaks
Total: 71

 145, 139, 137, 115, 112  Li Hang
 145, 138, 104  Thepchaiya Un-Nooh
 142, 121  Eden Sharav
 142, 119  Hammad Miah
 140, 126  Ryan Day
 137, 120, 117, 115, 112, 108, 108, 107, 105  Judd Trump
 136, 101  Noppon Saengkham
 135, 134, 132, 119, 116, 114, 112, 111, 108, 102  Ronnie O'Sullivan
 134, 121, 102  Zhou Yuelong
 132  Luca Brecel
 132  Tian Pengfei
 131, 118  Lu Ning
 128, 127, 122, 122, 101  Mark Selby
 127  James Wattana
 125  Neil Robertson
 124, 113, 102  David Gilbert
 122  Niu Zhuang
 120, 110  Jimmy Robertson
 118, 109  Daniel Wells
 115  Sam Craigie
 113  Robin Hull
 113  Joe O'Connor
 113  Ben Woollaston
 111  Zhang Yong
 110  Mark King
 107  Peter Ebdon
 105  Sam Baird
 102  Harvey Chandler
 102  Tom Ford
 102  Luo Honghao
 101  Ian Burns
 101  Andrew Higginson
 100  Zhang Anda

References

Home Nations Series
2018
2018 in snooker
2018 in Northern Ireland sport
Sports competitions in Belfast
2010s in Northern Ireland
21st century in Belfast
November 2018 sports events in the United Kingdom